Virginia's 22nd congressional district is an obsolete congressional district.  It was eliminated in 1833 after the 1830 U.S. Census.  Its last Congressman was Joseph Draper.

List of members representing the district

References 

 Congressional Biographical Directory of the United States 1774–present

22
Former congressional districts of the United States
Constituencies established in 1803
Constituencies disestablished in 1833
1803 establishments in Virginia
1833 disestablishments in Virginia